is the first EP from Japanese nu metal/hardcore punk band Maximum the Hormone. This was the second record and first EP of the band to feature the current lineup. The EP also commonly goes by the title Ootori. this was the band's final release with Sky, as they later established their own music label Mimikajiru & later they would sign to VAP.

Track listing

Personnel
 Daisuke – lead and backing vocals
 Maximum the Ryo – guitar, backing and lead vocals
 Ue-chan – bass guitar, backing vocals
 Nao – drums, backing and lead vocals

References

Maximum the Hormone albums
Japanese-language EPs
2001 EPs